Leon Jerome Braithwaite (born 17 December 1972) is an English former footballer. He played for Exeter City, making a total of 66 Football League appearances. He made appearances for Margate, scoring 38 goals. He joined Margate from Welling United in 2000 and had two spells with the club, leaving for the second time in 2005. Braithwaite's spell at St. Patrick's Athletic in the League of Ireland was notable for a number of key goals, including a winning goal against title rivals Cork City in Turner's Cross. Leon won two league of Ireland championship medals with St Patricks Athletics and represented the club in the champions league qualifier where he was influential in the 0–0 draw at against Glasgow Celtic FC at Park head in front of a full house of 60000 supporters only to lose the return leg 0:2
Leon got called up to the Trinidad and Tobago squad, yet did not make his debut due to injury

Personal life
He is the brother of athlete Darren Braithwaite. 
Leon and his brother Darren coach talented Junior athletes in track and field mainly in the 100m & 200m sprints
Like his brother Leon has represented GB Vets in athletics. 
Leon Has a MSc in sports psychology

Honours
League of Ireland: 2
 St. Patrick's Athletic - 1997/98, 1998/99
 1 England non league cap vs USA
 League of Ireland league supporters player of the Month February 1998
 At the time, held the record for the fastest league hat-trick in Conference History for Margate FC vs Woking (17 mins). This was better however at Christmas 2006 by Crawley Town's Charles Adameno, who scored a hat-trick within the first eight minutes of the club's league match at Grays Athletic.

Notes

References

External links
Profile at Margate FC

English footballers
English expatriate footballers
1972 births
Living people
Footballers from the London Borough of Hackney
Margate F.C. players
Enfield Town F.C. players
Exeter City F.C. players
Dagenham & Redbridge F.C. players
Welling United F.C. players
Fisher Athletic F.C. players
St Patrick's Athletic F.C. players
League of Ireland players
English Football League players
National League (English football) players
Southern Football League players
Bishop's Stortford F.C. players
Leyton F.C. players
Collier Row F.C. players
Ilford F.C. players
Erith & Belvedere F.C. players
Great Wakering Rovers F.C. players
Redbridge F.C. players
Heybridge Swifts F.C. players
Isthmian League players
England semi-pro international footballers
Expatriate association footballers in the Republic of Ireland
English expatriate sportspeople in Ireland
Association football forwards